Silent Waters may refer to:

 Khamosh Pani (English: Silent Waters), a 2003 French/German film set in Punjab, Pakistan 
 Silent Waters (Leprous EP), 2004
 Silent Waters (Amorphis album), 2007